Midway is an unincorporated community in Jefferson County, Arkansas, United States.

References

Unincorporated communities in Jefferson County, Arkansas
Unincorporated communities in Arkansas